El Dher District is a district in the south east  Galguduud region of Somalia.

References

External links
 Districts of Somalia
 Administrative map of El Dher District

Districts of Somalia

Galguduud